Haibrany Nick Ruiz Díaz Minervino (born 31 August 1992) is a Uruguayan footballer who plays as a centre-back or right-back for Platense in the Primera División Argentina, on loan from Plaza Colonia.

References

External links

1992 births
Living people
Uruguayan footballers
Uruguayan expatriate footballers
Association football defenders
C.A. Bella Vista players
C.A. Progreso players
Boston River players
Salam Zgharta FC players
C.A. Rentistas players
Villa Teresa players
Club Atlético Platense footballers
Uruguayan Primera División players
Uruguayan Segunda División players
Lebanese Premier League players
Argentine Primera División players
Uruguayan expatriate sportspeople in Lebanon
Uruguayan expatriate sportspeople in Argentina
Expatriate footballers in Lebanon
Expatriate footballers in Argentina